John Chandler Rafferty (December 29, 1816 – December 30, 1880) was an American politician.

Rafferty was born in Woodbury, N. J., December 29, 1816. His father, the Rev. William Rafferty, D.D., was born in Ireland, educated at Glasgow, removed to America, married Miss Chandler, of Orange County, N. J., lived for a time in Woodbury, and was principal of St. John's College, Annapolis, Md., from 1824 until his death in 1831.

John Rafferty graduated from Yale College in 1835.  After graduation, he attended lectures in the Harvard Law School, and continued his preparation in the office of O.W. Ogden, Esq., New York City, where he was admitted to the bar in 1838. In 1841, he married Laura E. Ogden, by whom he had two sons and two daughters. From the time of his marriage
until 1862, he resided near Germantown, and during this period held for three years the office of New York State Senator; in 1860 he was elected Secretary of the Senate, and was one of the delegates at large to the memorable convention at Charleston.

In 1862 he removed to Flemington, N.J. In 1863 he was admitted counsellor, and was appointed by Gov. Joel Parker the military agent for New Jersey; this position he occupied for three years at Washington. In 1867 he was elected to the office of County Superintendent of Schools. In 1872 he was appointed to fill a vacancy in the Court of Common Pleas, and in 1877 was made Prosecutor of the Pleas.

On the evening of December 30, 1880, he was without warning stricken by paralysis. He did not return to consciousness, but died early the next morning. His wife died in 1864; one daughter and two sons survived their parents.

External links

1816 births
1880 deaths
Politicians from Woodbury, New Jersey
Yale College alumni
Harvard Law School alumni
New York (state) lawyers
New York (state) state senators
New Jersey local politicians
New Jersey lawyers
19th-century American politicians
19th-century American lawyers